R. G. Dubey (Born as; Rajaram Girdharilal Dubey) was an Indian politician and Member of Parliament in 1st Lok Sabha and 3rd Lok Sabha.

Early life and education 

R. G. Dubey was born in Sholapur, Maharashtra. He completed his education at P.D. J.D. Darbar High Schools, Bijapur.

Political career 
R. G. Dubey started working as a congress worker in 1930. He was General Secretary of the Mysore Pradesh Congress Committee in 1960.

Positions held

References 

Indian National Congress politicians from Karnataka
Lok Sabha members from Karnataka
India MPs 1952–1957
India MPs 1962–1967
Year of birth missing